Walton railway station was a station in Walton, Cambridgeshire. It was on the Midland Railway's Syston and Peterborough Railway line between Peterborough and Stamford. It was closed in 1953. The Great Northern Railway main line runs adjacent to the Midland Railway at this point, but the Great Northern never had a station in Walton. This was due to an agreement whereby the Midland carried materials to the site during construction of the Great Northern, and in return the Great Northern offered no competition for services on this section

References

External links
A photograph of the station building
Photographs of the station building and the signal box

Disused railway stations in Cambridgeshire
Transport in Peterborough
Buildings and structures in Peterborough
Railway stations in Great Britain opened in 1846
Railway stations in Great Britain closed in 1953
Former Midland Railway stations